Job Kienhuis (born 7 November 1989) is a Dutch swimmer who mainly specializes in the middle- and long freestyle events. He is currently training under the guidance of former world champion Marcel Wouda alongside Olympic champion Hinkelien Schreuder. He holds 4 national records, the 800 m and 1500 m freestyle in both long course and short course.

Swimming career

Kienhuis participated in the 2007 European Junior Swimming Championships in Antwerp, Belgium where ended 16th in the 400 m freestyle and 12th in the 1500 m freestyle. In the summer of 2008 he won a gold medal at the 2008 European Junior Open Water Swimming Championships in Sète, France.

In December 2008 at the Swim Cup Eindhoven 2008 he broke the national records in the 800 m and 1500 m freestyle, long course. Two weeks later at the national short course champions he lowered the national record at the 1500 m freestyle.

He won bronze in the 1500 m freestyle at the 2010 European Short Course Championships which was held in Eindhoven.

In 2012, he represented the Netherlands at the Olympics in the 1500 m freestyle but did not reach the final.

Personal bests

See also
List of Dutch records in swimming

References

1989 births
Living people
Dutch male freestyle swimmers
People from Denekamp
Swimmers at the 2012 Summer Olympics
Olympic swimmers of the Netherlands
Sportspeople from Overijssel
21st-century Dutch people